You Belong to Me is a 2004 compilation album of songs recorded by American singer Jo Stafford. It is one of many Stafford compilations to have been released in the early 2000s under the title You Belong to Me, the name derived from the song of the same name which became one of her best known hits during the 1950s. This album was released on June 29, 2004 by Remember Records.

Track listing

 You Belong to Me		 	
 Shrimp Boats		 	
 Keep It a Secret		 	
 Jambalaya		 	
 If		 	
 Ay-Round the Corner		 	
 Tennessee Waltz		 	
 Hambone		 	
 Some Enchanted Evening		 	
 Ragtime Cowboy Joe		 	
 Whispering Hope		 	
 Hey, Good Lookin'		 	
 No Other Love		 	
 Pretty Eyed Baby		 	
 Somebody		 	
 If You've Got the Money, I've Got the Time		 	
 In the Cool, Cool, Cool of the Evening		 	
 Scarlet Ribbons (For Her Hair)		 	
 (Tonight We're) Setting the Woods on Fire		 	
 Once and for Always		 	
 Congratulations		 	
 Kissin' Bug Boogie		 	
 It Is No Secret (What God Can Do)		 	
 Gambella (Gambling Lady)		 	
 Early Autumn	 	
 (Now and Then There's) A Fool Such as I

References

2004 compilation albums
Jo Stafford compilation albums